The Taipei Metro Xinzhuang station is a station on the Zhonghe–Xinlu line located in Xinzhuang District, New Taipei, Taiwan. The station opened for service on 5 January 2012.

Station overview

This two-level, underground station has an island platform. It is located beneath the intersection of Zhongzheng Rd. and Zhonghua Rd., in front of Xinzhuang Junior High School. It was scheduled to open in March 2012 along with most of the Xinzhuang Line, but opened earlier for service on 5 January 2012.

Construction
It has two entrances, two accessibility elevators, and two vent shafts. One of the entrances and vent shafts is integrated into the planned Health Center building.

Design
The theme for the station is "Flying Silk-Weaving Future".

Station layout

Exits
Exit 1: Zhongzheng Rd., near Zhonghua Rd. 
Exit 2: Zhongzheng Rd., beside the main gate of Xinzhuang Junior High School

Around the station
 Banqiao 435 Art Zone
 Xinhai Constructed Wetland
 Xinzhuang Baseball Stadium
Xinzhuang Junior High School
Xinzhuang District Office
Xinzhuang Post Office
New Taipei City Police Department, Xinzhuang Branch
Xinzhuang St.
Wusheng Temple
Xinzhuang Ciyou Temple
Wenchang Temple
Xinzhuang Night Market
Xiaoxiyuan Performance Museum
Hengyi High School
Xinzhuang Elementary School
Guangfu Temple

References

Zhonghe–Xinlu line stations
Railway stations opened in 2012